Madison County Courthouse may refer to:

 Madison County Courthouse (Alabama)
 Madison County Courthouse (Arkansas), Huntsville, Arkansas, listed on the National Register of Historic Places (NRHP)
 Madison County Courthouse (Florida), Madison, Florida
 Madison County Courthouse (Georgia), Danielsville, Georgia
 Madison County Courthouse (Iowa), Winterset, Iowa, NRHP-listed
 Madison County Courthouse (Idaho), Rexburg, Idaho, NRHP-listed
 Madison County Courthouse (Kentucky), Richmond, Kentucky, NRHP-listed
 Madison County Courthouse (Mississippi), a Mississippi Landmark
 Madison County Courthouse (Missouri), Fredericktown, Missouri, NRHP-listed
Madison County Courthouse (Montana), a county courthouse in a NRHP-listed historic district
Old Madison County Courthouse, Morrisville, New York
 Madison County Courthouse (North Carolina), Marshall, North Carolina, NRHP-listed
 Madison County Courthouse (Ohio), London, Ohio, NRHP-listed in Madison County, Ohio
 Madison County Courthouse (Tennessee), Jackson, Tennessee
 Madison County Courthouse (Texas), Madisonville, Texas
 Madison County Courthouse (Virginia), Madison, Virginia, NRHP-listed
Madison County Courthouse Historic District, Madison, Virginia

See also
Madison Parish Courthouse, Tallulah, Louisiana